EDM trap is a fusion genre of hip hop, rave music and EDM, that originated in the early 2010s on peaking popularity of big room house and trap music genres. It blends elements of trap, which is an offshoot of Southern hip hop, with elements of electronic dance music like build-ups, drops, and breakdowns. As it was popularized, it increasingly began incorporating pop and EDM elements.

History
In 2012, a style of electronic dance music (EDM) incorporated elements of trap music, creating "dirty, aggressive beats [and] dark melodies." Electronic music producers, such as TNGHT, Baauer, RL Grime and Flosstradamus expanded the popularity, and brought wider attention to the derivative forms of trap. This genre saw the use of techno, dub, and electro sounds combined with the Roland TR-808 drum samples and vocal samples typical of trap.

In the later half of 2012, these various offshoots of trap became increasingly popular and made a noticeable impact on the American electronic dance music scene. The music was initially dubbed simply as "trap" by producers and fans, which led to the term "trap" being used to address the music of both rappers and electronic producers, to much confusion among followers of both. Instead of referring to a single genre, the term "trap" has been used to describe two separate genres of hip hop and dance music. The new wave of the genre has been labeled by some as "EDM trap" to distinguish it from the rap genre. The terms "trap-techno" and "trapstep" are often labeled by producers to describe the musical structure of an individual track. The evolving EDM trap has seen incorporation and stylistic influences from dubstep, in which trap has been hailed as the superseding phase of dubstep during the mid 2010s. The new phase typically plays at 140 BPM with strong bass drops, which has been growing in popularity since 2013.

In 2013, a fan-made video by Filthy Frank (also known as Joji), of electronic trap producer Baauer's track "Harlem Shake" became an internet meme, propelling the track to become the first trap song to hit number one on the Billboard Hot 100. This challenge consisted of one person dancing to the rhythm of the song until the beat dropped, in which then whoever else within the video would dance along with the person dancing in the beginning. Five EDM trap producers performed at the 2013 Ultra Music Festival in the United States, including DJ Craze, Baauer and Flosstradamus. The 2013 Tomorrowland festival featured a "trap stage".

On February 10, 2013, All Trap Music released their debut compilation album which featured 19 tracks from artists including RL Grime, Flosstradamus, Baauer, Bro Safari and 12th Planet. Described by the music press as the first album of its kind it reached number two in the iTunes dance chart with Vibe stating it was "the world's biggest-selling EDM trap album ever." In 2013, DJ Snake and Lil Jon released the single "Turn Down for What", which became both a commercial hit charting in several countries and a critical hit. Rolling Stone voted "Turn Down for What" as the second best song of 2014, saying that, "The year's nutsiest party jam was also the perfect protest banger for a generation fed up with everything. DJ Snake brings the synapse-rattling EDM and Southern trap music; Lil Jon brings the dragon-fire holler for a hilarious, glorious, glowstick-punk fuck you."

Trap music has also found fame internationally, especially in South Korea. In November 2014, the K-pop duo G-Dragon and Taeyang of the South Korean boy band BIGBANG, released their single "Good Boy", where it incorporated strong elements of trap and electronic flavors. The single garnered 2 million views in less than 24 hours and was met with positive reviews from music critics. In June 2015, trap again resurfaced in the K-pop sphere when BIGBANG released their commercial hit single "Bang, Bang, Bang". The single was a critical and commercial success in South Korea reaching the apex of the Gaon Digital Chart, eventually selling more than 1 million digital singles by August 2015.

Trap began to fuse with synth-pop and emo pop in the late 2010s when Philadelphia producer group Working on Dying began to produce Eternal Atake the third studio album by Francisville rapper Lil Uzi Vert. Brandon Finessin of Working on Dying earned eight producer credits Lil Uzi Vert’s emo rap album, adding hyperpop and EDM elements to tradition trap drum sequences. This led to Lil Uzi Vert and Brandon Finessin leading the Billboard charts collaboratively on the Producers and Songwriters Top 100s. This caused an offshoot scene of hyperpop trap beats to emerge from minor YouTube producers based on Working on Dying’s electronic approach to trap music.

A new subgenre of trap music referred to as trapwave (or hardwave) emerged also in late 2010s that fuses trap music with synthwave.

References 

 
 EDM
Electronic dance music genres
21st-century music genres